Zacharia is an abandoned Turkish Cypriot village in the Paphos District of Cyprus, located 4 km south of Lysos.

References

Communities in Paphos District